Ja'Kobe Walter is an American basketball player who currently attends Link Academy in Branson, Missouri.

Early life and high school
Walter grew up in McKinney, Texas and initially attended McKinney High School. He averaged 23.3 points, 7.6 rebounds, 1.9 assists, and 2.3 steals per game as a junior as McKinney won the state championship. Walter transferred to Link Academy in Branson, Missouri prior to the start of his senior year. Walter was selected to play in the 2023 McDonald's All-American Boys Game during his senior year. He was also selected to play for Team USA in the Nike Hoops Summit.

Recruiting
Walter is a consensus five-star recruit and one of the top players in the 2023 class, according to major recruiting services. He committed to play college basketball at Baylor over offers from Texas, Auburn, and Alabama.

Personal life
Walter is a Christian. He has said, “My parents put me in the church at a young age and have always told me to put God first in anything I do. Faith has always been important for me since the beginning.”

References

External links
USA Basketball bio

Living people
American men's basketball players
Basketball players from Texas
Shooting guards